

Wigberht (or Wigbeorht or Wilbert) was a medieval Bishop of Sherborne.

Wigberht was consecrated between 793 and 801. He died between 816 and 825. In 814 he accompanied Archbishop Wulfred of Canterbury to Rome.

Citations

References

External links
 

Bishops of Sherborne (ancient)
9th-century deaths
8th-century English bishops
9th-century English bishops
Year of birth unknown